J Centauri (J Cen) is a star in the constellation Centaurus.  It is approximately 350 light years from Earth.

J Centauri is a spectral class B3V main sequence star with a mean apparent magnitude of 4.5 and a luminosity 500 times that of the Sun. The temperature of the star's photosphere is nearly 24,000 K. The rotation velocity at the equator is at least 223 km/s. It is believed to be a binary star system.

This star may be a member of the Scorpio-Centaurus OB association (Sco OB2). This is one of the nearest regions of recent star formation.

References

Centauri, J
Beta Cephei variables
B-type main-sequence stars
Centaurus (constellation)
5035
116087
065271
Durchmusterung objects